Elachista baldizzonella is a moth of the family Elachistidae that is found in Spain and Austria.

References

baldizzonella
Moths described in 1985
Moths of Europe